Chaetopsis hendeli is a species of ulidiid or picture-winged fly in the genus Chaetopsis of the family Tephritidae.

References

hendeli
Insects described in 1913